James Andrew Banks (28 April 1893 – 1942) was an English professional footballer who played for Starcliffe Celtic, St Gregorys, All Saints, Spennymoor United, Willington, Tottenham Hotspur, Norwich City and Luton Town.

Football career 
Between 1913 and 1922, Banks played mainly as an inside forward scoring 10 goals in 78 appearances in all competitions for Tottenham Hotspur. The highlight of his career at Tottenham was collecting a winners' medal in the 1921 FA Cup Final. On leaving White Hart Lane in 1923 he joined Norwich City where he featured in 124 matches and netted 23 goals for the Carrow Road club. In 1927 Banks moved to Luton Town where he went on to compete in a further 13 games and scored twice.

Honours 
Tottenham Hotspur
 1921 FA Cup Final winner

References 

1893 births
1942 deaths
Footballers from Wigan
English footballers
Association football inside forwards
Tottenham Hotspur F.C. players
Norwich City F.C. players
Luton Town F.C. players
Willington A.F.C. players
Spennymoor United F.C. players
English Football League players
FA Cup Final players